Dikme may refer to:

Places
Dikme, Bitlis, village in Bitlis province, Turkey
Dikme, Kayseri, village in Kayseri province, Turkey

People
Mehmet Dikme, Minister of Agriculture of Bulgaria from 2001 to 2005
 Umut Dikme, snooker player, competitor in 2018 Paul Hunter Classic

See also